Figueiredo Sobral (1926 – 13 August 2010) was a Portuguese painter, sculptor and poet. His monumental sculptures and murals are displayed in public spaces in Portugal and Brazil. His work is held in many public and private collections.

Life

Jose Maria Figueiredo Sobral was born in Lisbon in 1926. 
He graduated from the Antonio Arroio Decorative Arts School (Escola Secundária Artística António Arroio)  where he studied under Lino António, Paula Campos and Rodrigues Alves.
Sobral worked in a range of media including painting, graphic design, illustration, scenography and poetry.
His paintings were first shown publicly at the General Exhibitions of Fine Arts (SNBA, Lisbon) immediately after World War II (1939–45).
He joined the Portuguese surrealist group formed by Antônio Maria Lisboa and Cesariny Vasconcelos.
His first individual exhibition was in Castelo de Vide in 1952. 
Since then his work has been shown in many individual and group exhibitions.

Until the late 1950s Sobral worked in creative advertising and a graphic illustration.
He also wrote poetry and drama, and worked as a layout designer.
He was critical of the regime of António de Oliveira Salazar, and was arrested several times for political reasons.
He took up sculpture in the 1960s, and then ceramics.
In 1970 he began to collaborate in making tapestry with the Manufactura de Tapeçarias de Portalegre.
He was a co-founder of the Minotauro publishing house with Urbano Tavares Rodrigues.
This company published the Minotauro magazine.
In 1975 he moved to Americana, São Paulo, where he created a sculpture for the city entrance at the invitation of former Mayor Ralph Biasi.
Figueiredo Sobral died on 13 August 2010 in Lisbon at the age of 85.

Sobral's monumental sculptures and mural paintings are installed in urban public spaces in Brazil and Portugal.
His work is held in the Boston Museum, The Art World Gallery, Michigan and the Interart Gallery, Miami, and in private collections in Portugal, Antwerp, Brussels, Paris, Toulon, São Paulo and Chicago.

Individual exhibitions
n.d. - Porto (Portugal) - Galeria Dois
n.d. - Porto (Portugal) - Galeria Opinião
1978 - Santos SP - Galeria Stella Maris
1979 - Guarujá SP - Civiltec Feira de Arte
1979 - São Paulo SP - Galeria Paulo Prado
1980 - Santos SP - Figueiredo Sobral, desenho, escultura e aquarela, no CCBEU
1981 - Lisbon (Portugal) - Galeria São Mamede
1984 - Lisbon (Portugal) - Galeria São Francisco
1984 - São Paulo SP - Galeria Paulo Prado

Prizes and medals

1959 F. Tomar first prize
1960 QFUC first prize
1961 Antoniana Exhibition third prize
1961 VII Autumntime Exhibition Bronze Medal
1963 IX Autumntime Exhibition Bronze Medal
1964 II Modern Art Hall Silver Medal
MAC'2000 - Career, MAC – Movimento Arte Contemporânea, Lisbon.

References

Sources

Further reading

1926 births
2010 deaths
Portuguese artists